Luis Ángel Landín Cortés (born 23 July 1985) is a Mexican professional footballer who plays as a forward.

Career

Club
Landín began his career in the youth development system of Pachuca. Landín made Primera División de México (Mexico First Division) debut in 2004 with the Pachuca senior team and played with the club until 2007. For the Apertura 2007, Landín was sold to Monarcas Morelia where he served as a forward. For the Clausura 2009, he was loaned to Cruz Azul.

Landín signed with Major League Soccer side Houston Dynamo on 20 August 2009, as the club's first Designated Player. Landin was released by the Houston Dynamo on 14 July 2010 after less than one season with the team. Landín signed with Atlante on 14 July 2010 and was on loan two days later.

After a few years playing at Ascenso MX, Landin signed with Brownsville Barracudas as a designated player for the MASL 2015–2016 season in September 2015. He resigned on January 24. ending his indoor soccer venture with 15 goals and 23 points (goals & assists).

He signed with Costa Rican club Pérez Zeledon in May 2016. After a poor first season where he scored only 2 goals, he ended as second best scorer at the Campeonato de Verano 2017 in the Costa Rican Primera División with 13 goals, just below Erick Scott. He didn't extend his contract becoming a free agent.

Landín signed with C.S. Herediano on 27 April 2017.

International
Landín made his senior national team debut on 1 March 2006, in a friendly against Ghana in Frisco, Texas. Landín was called in to replace the injured Jared Borgetti in the 2007 Copa América, where he made two appearances. He also played for Mexico U-23 in the 2008 CONCACAF Men's Pre-Olympic Tournament as Mexico failed to qualify for Olympic medal competition.

Personal
In 2009, Landín married his girlfriend.

Career statistics

International

Honours
Pachuca
Mexican Primera División: Clausura 2006, Clausura 2007
CONCACAF Champions Cup: 2007
Copa Sudamericana: 2006

Guastatoya
Liga Nacional de Guatemala: Apertura 2020

References

External links

1985 births
Living people
C.S.D. Municipal players
C.F. Pachuca players
Atlético Morelia players
Cruz Azul footballers
Houston Dynamo FC players
Club Puebla players
Querétaro F.C. footballers
Tecos F.C. footballers
Liga MX players
Mexico international footballers
2007 Copa América players
People from Zamora, Michoacán
Footballers from Michoacán
Mexican footballers
Atlante F.C. footballers
Expatriate soccer players in the United States
Expatriate footballers in Costa Rica
Expatriate footballers in Guatemala
Major League Soccer players
Designated Players (MLS)
Association football forwards
RGV Barracudas FC players
Major Arena Soccer League players